Katanning was an electoral district of the Legislative Assembly in the Australian state of Western Australia from 1904 to 1989.

The district centred on the town of Katanning in the southern part of the state. The seat was a conservative electorate; it was never won by the Labor Party.

The district was known as Katanning-Roe from 1983, before it was finally abolished in 1989.

Members

Election results 

Katanning